A list of films produced by the Bollywood film industry based in Mumbai in 1977:

Top-grossing films
The top ten grossing films at the Indian Box Office in 
1977:

A-Z

References

External links
 Indian Film Songs from the Year 1977 - A look back at 1977 with a focus on the Hindi film song

1977
Bollywood
Films, Bollywood